Memecylon myrtiforme is a species of plant in the family Melastomataceae. It is endemic to Mauritius.  Its natural habitat is subtropical or tropical dry forests.

References

myrtiforme
Endemic flora of Mauritius
Critically endangered plants
Taxonomy articles created by Polbot
Taxobox binomials not recognized by IUCN